Miar Peak is a mountain in Hispar Valley in the Nagar Valley and Bagrot Valley of Gilgit-Baltistan, Pakistan. It lies southeast of Diran peak (7,257 m) and northwest of Malubiting peak (7,428 m).

Images

See also
 Miar Glacier

External links
 Northern Pakistan detailed placemarks in Google Earth

Mountains of Gilgit-Baltistan
Six-thousanders of the Karakoram